Austin is a city in Lonoke County, Arkansas, United States. The population was 2,038 as of the 2010 census and an estimated 3,693 as of 2018. It is part of the Little Rock–North Little Rock–Conway Metropolitan Statistical Area.

History
The city was first settled circa 1872 when the St. Louis, Iron Mountain and Southern Railroad built its tracks approximately one mile southeast of Old Austin. Many residents of Old Austin moved near the railroad tracks, in some cases uprooting and transporting entire buildings. The new city forming near the tracks was originally known as "Austin Station" to distinguish it from the original Austin, but eventually became known as Austin while the old community became known as "Old Austin".

Geography
Austin is located in northern Lonoke County at  (35.005248, -91.989167). It is bordered to the southwest by the city of Cabot and to the northeast by the city of Ward.

U.S. Route 67/167, a four-lane freeway, passes through Austin, with access from Exit 22. Highway 67/167 leads southwest through Cabot  to Little Rock, the state capital, and northeast  to Searcy.

Demographics

2020 census

As of the 2020 United States census, there were 3,460 people, 1,249 households, and 969 families residing in the city.

2010 census
As of the census of 2010, there were 2,038 people. 218 households, and 173 families residing in the city. The racial makeup of the city was 96.20% White, 0.17% Black or African American, 0.17% Native American, 1.32% from other races, and 2.15% from two or more races. 5.62% of the population were Hispanic or Latino of any race.

There were 218 households, out of which 38.1% had children under the age of 18 living with them, 65.1% were married couples living together, 8.3% had a female householder with no husband present, and 20.2% were non-families. 15.1% of all households were made up of individuals, and 6.9% had someone living alone who was 65 years of age or older. The average household size was 2.78 and the average family size was 3.09.

In the city, the population was spread out, with 26.4% under the age of 18, 9.9% from 18 to 24, 32.7% from 25 to 44, 21.5% from 45 to 64, and 9.4% who were 65 years of age or older. The median age was 36 years. For every 100 females, there were 103.0 males. For every 100 females age 18 and over, there were 103.2 males.

The median income for a household in the city was $44,063, and the median income for a family was $49,107. Males had a median income of $30,069 versus $21,116 for females. The per capita income for the city was $17,369. About 3.6% of families and 6.3% of the population were below the poverty line, including 7.6% of those under age 18 and 6.8% of those age 65 or over.

Schools
The city currently has no schools, although it is part of Cabot Public Schools, which serves the northern part of Lonoke County including Austin. Elementary school (grades K-4) students to the north of U.S. Highway 67/167 attend Mountain Springs Elementary near northwestern Cabot, while those to the south of the freeway attend Northside Elementary in Cabot's city core. Older students attend Cabot Middle School North (grades 5-6), Cabot Junior High North (grades 7-8), Cabot Freshman Academy (grade 9), and Cabot High School (grades 10-12), all in Cabot.

Notable people
Joe Farrer, physical therapist and member of the Arkansas House of Representatives

References

External links
Official website

Cities in Arkansas
Cities in Lonoke County, Arkansas
Cities in Little Rock–North Little Rock–Conway metropolitan area